Paranthrene is a genus of moths in the family Sesiidae.

Species
Paranthrene diaphana Dalla Torre & Strand, 1925
Paranthrene flammans (Hampson, [1893a])
Paranthrene insolita Le Cerf, 1914
Paranthrene insolita insolita Le Cerf, 1914
Paranthrene insolita mardina Špatenka & Laštuvka, 1997
Paranthrene insolita polonica Schnaider, [1939]
Paranthrene insolita hispanica Špatenka & Laštuvka, 1997
Paranthrene tabaniformis (Rottemburg, 1775)
Paranthrene tabaniformis tabaniformis (Rottemburg, 1775)
Paranthrene tabaniformis kungessana (Alpheraky, 1882)
Paranthrene tabaniformis synagriformis (Rambur, [1866])
Paranthrene asilipennis (Boisduval in Guerin-Meneville, [1832])
Paranthrene dollii (Neumoegen, 1894)
Paranthrene fenestrata Barnes & Lindsey, 1922
Paranthrene pellucida Greenfield & Karandinos, 1979
Paranthrene robiniae (Edwards, 1880)
Paranthrene simulans (Grote, 1881)
Paranthrene dolens (Druce, 1899)
Paranthrene karli Eichlin, 1989
Paranthrene rufocorpus Eichlin, 1989
Paranthrene anthrax Le Cerf, 1916
Paranthrene callipleura (Meyrick, 1932)
Paranthrene chalcochlora Hampson, 1919
Paranthrene dukei Bartsch, 2008
Paranthrene mesothyris Hampson, 1919
Paranthrene porphyractis (Meyrick, 1937)
Paranthrene propyria Hampson, 1919
Paranthrene thalassina Hampson, 1919
Paranthrene xanthosoma (Hampson, 1910)
Paranthrene actinidiae Yang & Wang, 1989
Paranthrene affinis Rothschild, 1911
Paranthrene aureoviridis Petersen, 2001
Paranthrene auricollum (Hampson, [1893a])
Paranthrene aurifera Hampson, 1919
Paranthrene cambodialis (Walker, [1865])
Paranthrene chrysochloris (Hampson, 1897)
Paranthrene cupreivitta (Hampson, [1893])
Paranthrene cyanogama Meyrick, 1930
Paranthrene cyanopis Durrant, 1915
Paranthrene dohertyi (Rothschild, 1911)
Paranthrene dominiki Fischer, 2006a
Paranthrene gracilis (Swinhoe, 1890)
Paranthrene henrici Le Cerf, 1916
Paranthrene hyalochrysa Diakonoff, 1954
Paranthrene javana Le Cerf, 1916b
Paranthrene leucocera Hampson, 1919
Paranthrene meeki (Druce, 1898)
Paranthrene metallica (Hampson, [1893])
Paranthrene metaxantha Hampson, 1919
Paranthrene microthyris Hampson, 1919
Paranthrene minuta (Swinhoe, 1890)
Paranthrene noblei (Swinhoe, 1890)
Paranthrene oberthueri Le Cerf, 1916
Paranthrene panorpaeformis (Boisduval, [1875])
Paranthrene poecilocephala  Diakonoff, [1968]
Paranthrene pulchripennis (Walker, 1862)
Paranthrene rufifinis (Walker, 1862)
Paranthrene sesiiformis Moore, 1858
Paranthrene tristis Le Cerf, 1917
Paranthrene zoneiventris Le Cerf, 1916
Paranthrene zygophora Hampson, 1919

References

Sesiidae